Hortensius Béïque (September 29, 1889 – August 15, 1951) was a Canadian politician from Quebec.

Background

He was born on September 29, 1889 in Marieville and was a stock broker.

Federal Politics

Béïque unsuccessfully ran as a Conservative candidate for the district Chambly—Verchères in 1926.

Mayor

He served as Mayor of Chambly-Bassin, Quebec from 1930 to 1945.

Member of the legislature

Béïque ran as a Conservative candidate in 1931 for the district of Vaudreuil and won. He was defeated against Liberal candidate Alexandre Thurber in 1935.

He made a political comeback and was elected as a Union Nationale candidate in 1936, but lost re-election again in 1939.

He is particularly remembered for a comment he made in the legislative assembly on April 2, 1935, when he said, "The roads are as crooked as the government." When required to retract this unparliamentary statement, he corrected himself, saying, "I will say that the roads are not as crooked as the government."

Death

Béïque died on August 15, 1951.

References

1889 births
1951 deaths
Conservative Party of Quebec MNAs
Union Nationale (Quebec) MNAs
People from Montérégie